Santo Domingo is the male volleyball team of Santo Domingo.

History
The team was founded in 2007.

Current volleyball squad
As of December 2008

Coach:  Jorge Mercedez

Assistant coach:  Bonilla R.

References

External links
League Official website

Dominican Republic volleyball clubs
Volleyball clubs established in 2007